Juan Manuel Mendoza, is a Colombian television actor, known for his work in telenovelas. such as, A corazón abierto, an adaptation of the American medical drama Grey's Anatomy. His role as Esteban Sanínt in La Traicionera, adaptation of the Argentine telenovela Malparida. and for his outstanding roles in Dulce amor as Julián and The Girl. as Dr. Rodrigo Carrera. His most recent project was in 2018 in the Netflix series La Ley Secreta (otherwise known as Undercover Law) where he gave life to Eduardo Celis Alias el Halcón.

Filmography

References

External links 
 

Living people
Colombian male telenovela actors
21st-century Colombian male actors
1980 births